Knanaya Archdiocese either refers to:
 Syro-Malabar Catholic Archeparchy of Kottayam of the Knanaya Catholics  or
 Malankara Syriac Knanaya Archdiocese of the Knanaya Jacobites.